The Sulanda ( is a river in Arkhangelsk Oblast, Russia, a left tributary of the Puya.

References

Rivers of Arkhangelsk Oblast